The Execution of Stepan Razin (Russian «Казнь Степана Разина») (Op. 119) is a cantata composed by Dimitri Shostakovich to a libretto by Yevgeny Yevtushenko in 1964. The subject is the execution of Stepan Razin, a Cossack leader who headed a major uprising (1670–71) against the nobility and tsarist bureaucracy in southern Russia.

Lyrics
The opening section of Yevtushenko's poem depicts Razin's fate in front of the uncaring crowd:

In the middle section, Razin reflects on his fate: "Fool! Stenka, you die for nothing!" The final section describes the execution itself, in very short, choppy lines: the crowd falls silent, and Razin's head - still living - laughs his triumph over the watching tsar.

Recordings
 Shostakovich: Cantatas — Estonian Concert Choir, ENSO Paavo Järvi Erato 2015.
 The Execution of Stepan Razin — Seattle Symphony Chorale, Seattle Symphony, Gerard Schwarz: Naxos 2006.
 Symphony No. 12 and The Execution of Stepan Razin — Rundfunkchor & Sinfonie-orchester Leipzig, Herbert Kegel: Philips 1992.
 Georgy Sviridov Oratorio Pathetique and Shostakovich The Execution of Stepan Razin — Varna Philharmonic Orchestra and Chorus, Andrey Andreev (cond.) & Assen Vassilev (bass): Koch International Classics 1990.
 Symphony No. 9 and The Execution of Stepan Razin — Moscow State Philharmonic Symphony Orchestra & Republican Russian Choir Capella, Kirill Kondrashin (cond.) & Vitali Gromadsky (bass): Melodiya 1965 (reissued as a CD in 2015 by High Definition Tape Transfers).

See also
List of compositions by Dmitri Shostakovich

References

External links
 Russian libretto to Erato recording of Shostakovich Cantatas
 lyrics in Russian
 lyrics in Russian (alternative site)
 Index to texts of other poems set by Shostakovich

1964 compositions
Compositions by Dmitri Shostakovich